The Mississippi Coliseum is a 6,500-seat multi-purpose arena in Jackson, Mississippi, built in 1962 and located on the Mississippi State Fairgrounds complex. The arena has 6,812 seats available for basketball, and can be expanded to 10,000 for concerts. It sits 2900 feet (884 meters) atop the extinct Jackson Volcano.

In addition to the Coliseum, the Mississippi State Fairgrounds includes:  The Mississippi Trade Mart, the A & I agricultural complex and the Kirk Fordice Equine Center.

It was home to the Jackson Bandits minor league ice hockey team from 1999 to 2003.

The Fairgrounds hosts the Mississippi State Fair each October. Each February, the Mississippi Coliseum and surrounding complex host The Dixie National Rodeo, which is the largest rodeo east of the Mississippi River

Starting in the 2018–19 basketball season, Mississippi State Bulldogs men's basketball and Ole Miss Rebels men's basketball have played one game at the arena each season.

Past acts

3 Doors Down
311
.38 Special
A Perfect Circle
AC/DC
Accept
Aerosmith
Alabama
Alan Jackson
Alice Cooper
Amy Grant
The Animals
Argent
Autograph
B.B. King
Bachman–Turner Overdrive
Bad Company
Barnum and Bailey Circus
Barney the Dinosaur
Belinda Carlisle
Black Oak Arkansas
Black Sabbath
Blackfoot
Blue Öyster Cult
Bob Dylan
Bob Marley and the Wailers
Bob Seger and the Silver Bullet Band
Bobby 'Blue' Bland
Bobby Rush
Bon Jovi
Boyz II Men
Brad Paisley
Bread
Britny Fox
Bryan Adams
Buddy Guy
Buddy Miles
BulletBoys
Bush
Carrie Underwood
Casting Crowns
Cheap Trick
Cher
Chicago
Cinderella
Clay Crosse
Conway Twitty
Corey Hart
Creed
Creedence Clearwater Revisited
Crosby, Stills & Nash
Dan Fogelberg
David and the Giants
David Lee Roth
David Meece
Deana Carter
Def Leppard
DeGarmo & Key
Deniece Williams
Dirty Angels
Disney on Ice
Duwayne Burnside
Don Williams
Donny & Marie
Dr. John
Eddie Money
Eddie Murphy
Edgar Winter
Electric Light Orchestra
Elton John
Elvis Presley
Emerson, Lake & Palmer
En Vogue
Eric Benét
Faith Hill
Fastway
Fishbone
Fleetwood Mac
Flo & Eddie
Floyd Taylor
Foghat
Foreigner
Gaither Homecoming
Gary Wright
Gentle Giant
George Jones
George Strait
Glen Campbell
Goo Goo Dolls
Grand Funk Railroad
Grateful Dead
Great White
Gucci Mane
Guns N' Roses
Guy Hovis
Hall & Oates
Hank Williams Jr.
Harlem Globetrotters
Head East
Heart
Highway 101
Hinder
Ice Cube
Incubus
Iron Maiden
It's a Beautiful Day
Jackson Browne
Jackyl
James Gang
James Taylor
Jars of Clay
Jerry Jeff Walker
Jerry Lee Lewis
Jetboy
Jethro Tull
Jimmy Barnes
Jimmy Buffett
Joan Jett and the Blackhearts
Joe Cocker
Joe Walsh
John Denver
John Mayer
Johnny Cash in '72
Journey
Judas Priest
Junior and the Dolls
Kansas
Kathy Troccoli
KC and the Sunshine Band
Keb' Mo'
Kenny Loggins
Kid Rock
Kingdom Come
Kiss
Kix
Krokus
Leann Rimes
Lifehouse
Lillian Axe
Linda Ronstadt
Lita Ford
Little Milton
Live
Loggins & Messina
Lord of the Dance
Louisiana's LeRoux
Loverboy
Lynyrd Skynyrd
Manassas
Marie Osmond
Mark Lowry
Maroon 5
Marty Stuart
Maze
MC Hammer
MercyMe
Merle Haggard & the Strangers
Metallica
Michael Bolton
Michael English
Michael W. Smith
Mississippi Mass Choir
Molly Hatchet
Mötley Crüe
Mountain
'N Sync
Neil Diamond
No Doubt
Olivia Newton-John
Omar Cunningham
Ozzy Osbourne
Patty Loveless
Patty Smyth
Paul Revere & the Raiders
Pete Droge
Peter Frampton
Petra
Point of Grace
Poison
Power Station
Prince
Public Enemy
Queensrÿche
Rachael Ray
Rare Earth
Ratt
Ray Charles
Ray Stevens
REO Speedwagon
Rick Derringer
Rick James
Rick Springfield
Ricky Skaggs and Kentucky Thunder
Robin Trower
Rod Stewart
Run–D.M.C.
Rush
Russ Taff
Sammy Hagar
Sandi Patty
Saving Abel
Seether
Sepultura
Sesame Street Live
Shania Twain
Shinedown
Shirley Brown
Skid Row
Skillet
Slaughter
Sly and the Family Stone
Staind
Stevie Nicks
Stevie Ray Vaughan
Stryper
Styx
Sugarland
Survivor
Tammy Wynette
Tanya Tucker
Ted Nugent
Tesla
The Allman Brothers Band
The Babys
The Beach Boys
The Charlie Daniels Band
The Cult
The Diamonds
The Imperials
The Jackson Five
The Neville Brothers
The New Power Generation
Newsboys
The Oak Ridge Boys
The Osmond Brothers
The Pointer Sisters
Screamin' Cheetah Wheelies
The Temptations
The Wreckers
Thin Lizzy
Third Day
Three Crosses
Three Days Grace
Three Dog Night
TobyMac
Tom Jones
Tom Petty and the Heartbreakers
Tommy Shaw
Too $hort
Trans-Siberian Orchestra
Trick Pony
Van Halen
Vanilla Ice
Vince Gill
War
Warrant
White Lion
Whitesnake
Widespread Panic
Willie Nelson
Winger
Yes
ZZ Top

Past Acts References:

References

External links
Mississippi Coliseum Official Web Site

Indoor ice hockey venues in the United States
Basketball venues in Mississippi
Sports in Jackson, Mississippi
Buildings and structures in Jackson, Mississippi
Tourist attractions in Jackson, Mississippi
1962 establishments in Mississippi
Sports venues completed in 1962